Epaphroditus was a freedman of Octavian, the later Emperor Augustus.

After Octavian had succeeded in capturing the Egyptian Queen Cleopatra VII in her Mausoleum in Alexandria she was strictly guarded by Epaphroditus and some other guardians under his command, first in her Mausoleum, then in the palace (early August 30 BC).

Because Octavian allegedly wanted to present Cleopatra in his triumphal procession in Rome, he instructed Epaphroditus to prevent Cleopatra from killing herself. But the Queen was able to feign her will to live so that Epaphroditus observed her less strictly. Then she gave him an urgent sealed letter that he should deliver personally to Octavian and while he was absent she succeeded in committing suicide.

Some modern historians do not believe this ancient tradition, but assume that Octavian had no interest that Cleopatra survived. Because the Emperor knew that she rather wanted to die than to be presented in a triumph he ordered Epaphroditus – according to this theory – to control Cleopatra only apparently, so that she could easily commit suicide. Later he pretended to be angry that Cleopatra had been able to kill herself.

Notes

References 

 Michael Grant, Cleopatra 1972 and 1974, German edition 1998, p. 309 and 311.

1st-century BC Romans
Augustus
Emperor's slaves and freedmen